600 Miles is a 2015 Mexican drama film directed by Gabriel Ripstein. It was screened in the Panorama section of the 65th Berlin International Film Festival where it won the award for Best First Feature. It was one of fourteen films shortlisted by Mexico to be their submission for the Academy Award for Best Foreign Language Film at the 88th Academy Awards. On 17 September 2015 it was selected to represent Mexico for the Foreign Language Oscar but it was not nominated.

Plot 
Arnulfo Rubio smuggles weapons for a Mexican cartel. He is using an American associate, who buys the weapons in the United States for him. During one of the weapons purchases, ATF agent Hank Harris attempts to apprehend Arnulfo, but is surprised and knocked out by Arnulfo's American partner, who flees the scene immediately. A panicked Arnulfo restrains the unconscious Hank and loads him into a secret compartment of his SUV, driving over the border into Mexico with him. There, he lets Hank sit on the backseat, still handcuffed, while he drives to his hometown.

During the drive, they get into a roadblock set up by a different cartel. They are almost killed by the enforcers when they notice that a handcuffed American is in the car, but Hank is able to negotiate free passage by mentioning the names of several cartel members and assuring that he is doing business with them.

While driving further, Hank and Arnulfo begin to talk to each other and get closer, with Hank mentioning that his wife has died from a stroke 6 months ago and that they were unable to have children.

When they arrive, Arnulfo takes Hank to his uncle, a cartel member, and tries to explain that Hank could be useful to them with his knowledge of cartel information. His uncle, furious because Arnulfo created trouble by bringing an American government employee to him, ignores his explanation. He demands that Arnulfo kill Hank. When Arnulfo cannot bring himself to do it, his uncle attempts to shoot Hank, only to be shot and killed himself at the last second by Arnulfo.

Hank and Arnulfo try to flee the country, with Hank calling some associates to arrange a safe extraction to the United States. They wait at the house of another of Arnulfo's uncles for Hank's associates. But the uncle secretly has alerted the cartel, who send enforcers to catch and/or kill both. Hank is able to flee the house while Arnulfo is caught. But Hank returns, shoots and kills the enforcers and flees with Arnulfo.

Somewhere in the desert in the border country between Mexico and the United States, Hank lets Arnulfo get out of the car and drives away, leaving Arnulfo surprised and confused.

The film ends with a domestic scene at Hank's home which shows that, in contrast to what he told Arnulfo, Hank's wife is still alive and it is implied that he has children.

Cast
 Tim Roth as Hank Harris
 Kristyan Ferrer as Arnulfo Rubio
 Harrison Thomas as Carson
 Monica del Carmen as Mamá Rubio
 Julian Sedgwick as Ray Wilson
 Craig Hensley as Gunstore Owner 5 (as Craig Oldfather)
 Noé Hernández as Martín
 Greg Lutz as Willy
 Tad Sallee as Gun Show Exhibitor
 Harris Kendall as Greta

Production
Ripstein produced the film with Mexican director Michel Franco. The screenplay, by Ripstein and Issa López, was inspired by the ATF gunwalking scandal. Ripstein wanted to focus the story on the two characters, rather than expanding it to include the cartel leaders. He attempted to express his view of guns "objectively, almost like a documentarian", since he has been exposed to guns from an early age; his grandfather took him and his brother shooting on weekends, and "my brother became an exceptional shot; they hunted ducks and my grandmother cooked them".

Release and reception
600 Miles premiered in the Panorama Section of the 65th Berlin International Film Festival, where it won the Best First Feature Film award (the second consecutive award for a Mexican film; Alonso Ruizpalacios' Güeros won the previous year). Ripstein dedicated the award to his son, "who will surely be the fourth generation of our family to make films because he loves it".

The film opened on 150 screens in Mexico on 4 December 2015, and was selected to represent the country at the 88th Academy Awards in the Best Foreign Language Film category. About the process of receiving an Academy Award nomination, Ripstein said: "Much lobbying is required; unfortunately, film quality is not always decisive". The nominees that year represented Colombia, France, Jordan, Denmark, and Hungary (the eventual winner).

Review aggregator website Rotten Tomatoes reported a 92% approval rating based on 24 reviews, with a rating average of 7.7 out of 10. According to Peter Debruge of Variety, "Ripstein allows long stretches to go by in near-silence, gradually letting the tension build as the SUV travels farther south, deeper into potentially dangerous territory". Andrew Pulver of The Guardian gave 600 Miles three stars out of five, praising Roth's performance and calling the film a "pretty enterprising movie, subtly constructing its power relationship while not losing its grip on the basic sense of tension".

Awards and nominations

Ariel Awards
The Ariel Awards are awarded annually by the Mexican Academy of Film Arts and Sciences in Mexico. 600 Miles won two awards out of 13 nominations.

|-
|rowspan="13" scope="row"| 58th Ariel Awards
|scope="row"| 600 Miles
|scope="row"| Best Picture
| 
|-
|scope="row"| Gabriel Ripstein
|scope="row"| Best Direction
| 
|-
|scope="row"| Kristyan Ferrer
|rowspan="2" scope="row"| Best Actor
| 
|-
|scope="row"| Tim Roth
| 
|-
|scope="row"| Noé Hernández
|rowspan="1" scope="row"| Best Supporting Actor
| 
|-
|scope="row"| Carlos Jacques
|rowspan="1" scope="row"| Best Art Direction
| 
|-
|scope="row"| Gabriel Ripstein, Santiago Pérez Rocha
|rowspan="1" scope="row"| Best Editing
| 
|-
|scope="row"| Alejandro Vázquez
|rowspan="1" scope="row"| Best Special Effects
| 
|-
|scope="row"| Edgardo Mejía
|rowspan="1" scope="row"| Best Visual Effects
| 
|-
|scope="row"| Alejandro de Icaza, Federico González Jordán
|rowspan="1" scope="row"| Best Sound
| 
|-
|scope="row"| Gabriel Ripstein, Issa López
|rowspan="1" scope="row"| Best Original Screenplay
| 
|-
|scope="row"| Thal Echeveste
|rowspan="1" scope="row"| Best Make-Up
| 
|-
|scope="row"| Gabriel Ripstein
|rowspan="1" scope="row"| Best First Feature Film
| 
|-

Diosas de Plata
The Diosas de Plata are awarded annually by the Cinematographic Journalists Guild in Mexico (PECIME). 600 Miles received two awards out of six nominations.

|-
|rowspan="6" scope="row"| 45th Diosas de Plata
|scope="row"| 600 Miles
|scope="row"| Best Picture
| 
|-
|scope="row"| Gabriel Ripstein
|scope="row"| Best Director
| 
|-
|scope="row"| Kristyan Ferrer
|scope="row"| Best Actor
| 
|-
|scope="row"| Gabriel Ripstein, Issa López
|rowspan="1" scope="row"| Best Screenplay
| 
|-
|scope="row"| Santiago Pérez Rocha, Gabriel Ripstein
|rowspan="1" scope="row"| Best Editing
| 
|-
|scope="row"| Gabriel Ripstein
|rowspan="1" scope="row"| Best First Feature Film
| 
|-

See also
 List of submissions to the 88th Academy Awards for Best Foreign Language Film
 List of Mexican submissions for the Academy Award for Best Foreign Language Film

References

External links
 

2015 films
2015 drama films
2010s Spanish-language films
Mexican drama films
Films about Mexican drug cartels
Bureau of Alcohol, Tobacco, Firearms and Explosives in fiction
2010s Mexican films